The development of tribal areas in Himachal Pradesh is one of the major steps taken by the state government for its economic development. The border districts of Kinnaur, Lahaul, Spiti and the Pangi and Bharmour tehsils of Chamba districts are the major tribal areas of the state. They are located near the borders of Tibet and Indian States of Jammu and Kashmir. Other backward areas include Shillai in Sirmaur district, and deep cut-off  valleys in the Kullu and upper stretches of Kangra districts. Due to poor accessibility, life in these areas had grown in isolation.

History and development
Kinnaur was opened up in the early 1960s with the completion of the Hindustan-Tibet National highway. Lahaul was opened up in the late 1960s with the construction of roads over Rohtang pass. Lahaul is only in contact due to high passes like Rohtang (3,967 m, 13,050 ft), Kunzum (4,600 m, 14,913 ft) and Baralarcha (4,300 m, 14,000 ft).
Spiti is a cold desert and is a very underdeveloped area.

The building up of an efficient transport system was the top most priority in the first Five year plan. The state has three airports at Bhuntar in Kullu district, Jubbarhatti near Shimla and Gaggal in Kangra. It was only by January 1991 that Himachal was linked up with the broad gauge system by extending the Delhi-Nangal rail line. Although railways and airways in Himachal serve very limited transport needs of the people, the road network of the state makes it unique.

Geography
The geography of Himachal presents considerable challenge to the development of transport infrastructure. Nevertheless, the state has made significant progress in road connectivity in the last few decades. Himachal at present has the highest road density among all the hill states of India. Although Himachal also has three airports and two narrow gauge rail tracks, roads remain the main mode of transport in Himachal.

Roads

Eight national highways (NH) pass through the state with a total length of 1235 km. NH 1A touches Shahpur. NH 20 passes through Pathankot, Chakki, Nurpur, Joginder Nagar, Palampur and Mandi. NH 21 connects Chandigarh with Manali through Mandi. NH 22 connects Ambala with Kaurik through Kalka, Simla and Wangtoo. NH 70 passes through Mubarakpur, Amb, Nadaun and Hamirpur. NH 21A begins at Pinjore in Haryana, passes through Nalagarh and reaches Swarghat, where it connects with NH 21. NH 88 connects Simla with Kangra through Hamirpur and Nadaun. NH 72 begins at Ambala and passes through Amb and Paunta Sahib in Himachal Pradesh before terminating at Haridwar in Uttarakhand.
The state boasts some of the longest road tunnels in the country namely the 3 km long Aut tunnel in Mandi on NH-21 and the under construction 8.8 km Atal tunnel which will create an all year round link between Manali and Lahaul Valley which otherwise remains isolated during its 8 month long winter period.

In addition to the National Highways, the state also has a large mesh of highways and village roads. Most tourist spots in Himachal Pradesh such as Shimla, Manali, Dharamsala etc. are well connected by roads. Some of the roads in Himachal are seasonal and get closed during winters and monsoons due to heavy snowfall, landslides and washouts. The Manali-Leh road, for example, remains closed for most part of the winters. The World Bank has approved a loan of $220 million in 2007 to improve priority segments of the state road network.
Himachal Pradesh being a major tourist destination, there is no dearth of private buses and taxis. In spite of state being hilly, Hamirpur District has got highest road density in the country.
See also
 List of RTO districts in Himachal Pradesh
 List of state highways in Himachal Pradesh
 List of Major District Roads in Himachal Pradesh

Railway

Himachal has two narrow-gauge rail tracks. The Kalka-Shimla Railway track has a length of 96 kilometers. It passes through 102 tunnels and crosses 864 bridges. The track has been in existence for over a century now. Panoramic Kalka-Shimla Railway known to be an engineering marvel of British India. The level of difficulty in laying of tracks could be judged by a journey in the route. The other narrow gauge rail route in the state is the Kangra Valley Railway.

Bhanupli–Leh line is a proposed railway project in Himachal Pradesh which will be the longest railway track in the state and is expected to become the highest railway track in the world.

The Kangra Valley Railway covers a distance of 164 km (101.9 mi) from Pathankot, Punjab to Jogindernagar in Himachal Pradesh between This line is proposed to be converted to broad gauge and further linked to Bilaspur-Leh line at Mandi.

Both these tracks are commercially unviable but are operated because of their heritage value.

A broad gauge line exists which connects Nangal Dam in Punjab to Una in Himachal Pradesh. Currently this line is being extended till Talwara (Punjab) with track operational till Daulatpur Chowk.
Una is connected to New Delhi by Jan Shatabdi express and Himachal Express.

Air
The three airports in Himachal Pradesh are: Shimla Airport near Shimla, Gaggal Airport near Kangra and Bhuntar Airport near Kullu. All these airports have runways shorter than 5000 ft and therefore only allow the operation of smaller aircraft such as the Bombardier Dash 8, 70 seater ATR & 42 seater ATR.

References

External links

 The Tribune, Chandigarh, India - Himachal Pradesh
 Shimla Travel Guide:: Kalka-Shimla Railway
 Kalka Shimla Trains, Kalka Shimla Railway, Hills Toy Train in India
 Thirty inch lines D to L
 Article in The Tribune

 
Economy of Himachal Pradesh